Bradley Harris Dowden (born 1942) is an American philosopher and professor of philosophy at the California State University, Sacramento.

Work
He is a general editor of the Internet Encyclopedia of Philosophy. Dowden received his MS in physics from Ohio State University and his PhD in philosophy from Stanford University.
His main interests are metaphysics, philosophy of science, philosophy of mind, logic, time, paradox and infinity.

Bibliography
 Logical Reasoning, Bradley H. Dowden, Belmont CA: Wadsworth Publishing Co. 1993
 The Metaphysics of Time: A Dialogue (New Dialogues in Philosophy), Bradley Dowden, Rowman & Littlefield Publishers, 2009

See also
Grandfather paradox
Liar paradox
List of American philosophers

References

External links
Dowden's Personal Webpage
Bradley Dowden on YouTube

Living people
California State University, Sacramento faculty
Ohio State University alumni
Philosophy academics
Stanford University alumni
American logicians
21st-century American philosophers
Philosophers of science
Philosophers of mind
Analytic philosophers
Critics of parapsychology
Metaphysicians
1942 births
Place of birth missing (living people)